The Guild of Servants of the Sanctuary or GSS is an association of altar servers in the Church of England and the Church in Wales, with some overseas organisation in several other countries.

Objectives and Membership
The Guild states its objectives as follows:
 To raise the spiritual tone of altar servers;
 To promote a conscientious performance of the duties of altar servers; and 
 To encourage more frequent attendance at the Holy Eucharist, in addition to times of duty.
Membership is open to any man or woman who is an altar server in the Church of England and 'accepts Catholic Faith and Practice'.  (In the context of the Guild, Catholic is understood to mean 'of the universal church' and not 'Roman Catholic'.)

Organisation
The Guild is organised into local chapters, each overseen by a secretary, who is a member of the Guild, and a chaplain, who is a priest and thus a 'priest associate' of the Guild.  Chapters meet regularly: a typical gathering takes the form of a specially-tailored version of Evensong called the 'Guild Office': this consists largely of Psalms and Canticles sung antiphonally, culminating in the Magnificat (Song of Mary) and a brief reading from the Holy Bible.  The Guild Office will often be followed by a short address and perhaps Benediction.  When undertaking Guild activities, members dress in choir dress: typically a black cassock with a white surplice, but sometimes a white or coloured cassock-alb according to local usage.  Members also wear a special 'Guild Medal' engraved with the text (in Latin) 'I will go unto the altar of God', Introibo ad Altare Dei, which is the opening line of a well-known prayer said by those preparing to assist at the Holy Eucharist.

Ordination of women
As with many of the Catholic Societies of the Church of England, the Guild is officially opposed to the ordination of women.  On 18 March 2006 the Guild's General Council affirmed an earlier Warden's Statement not to recognise as valid the orders of women ordained to the priesthood and stated that any meeting using the sacramental offices of a woman priest could not be considered to be a meeting of the Guild; however, the Council stopped short of expelling individual members of the Guild who availed themselves of the offices of women priests outside the immediate context of the Guild, instead asking that they 'should respect the stance of the Guild on such matters.'

See also
Catholic Societies of the Church of England
 Confraternity of the Blessed Sacrament
 Guild of All Souls
 Society of the Holy Cross
 Society of King Charles the Martyr
 Society of Mary
 Company of Servers

Notes

References 
 GSS (no date).  About the Guild.  Accessed June 15, 2008.
 GSS (2006). Women Priests: A Statement by the General Council.  Accessed June 15, 2008.

Further reading 
 The Guild of Servants of the Sanctuary
 The Catholic Societies of the Church of England 
 The Church of England

Anglican organizations
Anglo-Catholicism
Church of England
Organisations based in Leicestershire
Religion in Leicestershire